Mount Dampier (Rangiroa in Māori) is New Zealand's third highest mountain, rising to . It is located in the Southern Alps, between Mount Hicks and Aoraki / Mount Cook. It is often traversed by climbers en route to the North ridge of Mount Cook. Its Māori name literally means 'long sky' (rangi: sky; roa: long).

The English name was originally Mount Hector, after James Hector, but in Fitzgerald's map of 1896 the peak had been renamed after William Dampier.

See also
 List of mountains of New Zealand by height

References

Southern Alps
Westland District
Mountains of Canterbury, New Zealand
Damp